A beet sugar factory or sugar factory, is a type of plant that produces raw sugar from sugar beet. The first beet sugar factory was founded in 1802. Nowadays, most beet sugar factories also serve as a sugar refinery.

Sugar mill, factory and refinery 

Nowadays there are four major types of sugar producing facilities:
 Beet Sugar factory: produces raw sugar from sugar beet and refines it.
 Cane Sugar factory: produces raw sugar from sugar cane and refines it.
 Sugar mill: produces raw sugar from sugar cane for shipping to a sugar refinery.
 Sugar refinery: produces refined sugar from raw cane sugar.

The beet sugar factory comes in four subtypes:
 Beet sugar factory: produces raw sugar from beet and refines it (as above).
 Beet sugar factory: as the previous, but with a molasses-desugaring process
 Beet sugar factory with raw can sugar refining (there are a few of this type)
 Raw factory: produces either raw beet sugar or thick juice to be refined elsewhere (Nowadays very few are of this type)

The terms sugar mill and sugar refinery are older than the term sugar factory. In the 18th century, the only practical way to produce (raw) sugar was to extract it from sugar cane. The extraction was done with a machine called a sugar mill, which pressed the juice out of the sugar cane. Later, the term sugar mill was also applied to the whole facility that produced raw sugar from sugar cane. Most of the raw sugar was transported to sugar refineries, which converted it to white sugar for consumers and other customers. This use of the terms mill and refinery is still very clear in e.g. the USA.

When the first facilities to produce sugar from sugar beets were built, these were mostly called manufactories or just factories, simply because they were buildings were something was manufactured. These first sugar factories were modest affairs driven by animals, wind- or water power. Like the sugar mills, sugar factories sold most of their raw sugar to sugar refineries. In time, most beet sugar factories began to refine their own production. In 2005 all sugar factories in the United States produced only refined sugar, but this was not universal practice.

In the tropics, the introduction of the steam engine put an end to the clear definitions of mill, factory and refinery. The creation of large separate steam powered facilities to produce raw sugar led to the separation of the manufacturing of raw sugar from the occupations of the planter. These buildings were also called sugar factories. Nowadays, the distinction between a sugar mill and a (cane) sugar factory is in whether it refines the raw sugar that it produces or sells it. This explains why in India EID Parry refers to sugar factories.

Sugar beet processing 

In the 1960s, beet sugar processing was described as consisting of 8 steps, but these can be further divided in smaller steps. Transport is not part of this process, but transport cost is of course very important for the scale at which processing can take place. Transport could therefore be added as a first step. Storage can also be discerned as an important separate step. The steps of purification and carbonatation and those following, are not specific to sugar beet processing, but are also applicable to producing sugar from sugar cane. Therefore, these are primarily part of the Sugar refining process.

1 Transport 

After they are harvested, beet are typically transported to a factory. 

In the UK, beets are transported by a hauler, or by a tractor and a trailer by local farmers. Railways and boats are no longer used. In Ireland some beets were carried by rail, until the complete shutdown of Irish Sugar beet production in 2006. The Netherlands originally relied on boats, and by 2021 this way of transport made a come back over there.

2 Reception 
On arrival at the factory, each load is weighed and sampled. The beet sample is checked for:
 soil tare – the amount of nonbeet delivered
 crown tare – the amount of low-sugar beet delivered
 sugar content ("pol") – amount of sucrose in the crop
 nitrogen content – for recommending future fertilizer use to the farmer
From these elements, the actual sugar content of the load is calculated and the grower's payment determined.

3 Storage 
The load is then tipped onto the reception area, typically a flat concrete pad. From there, the beet are moved into large heaps. When it is time to process them, the beet are moved into a central channel or gulley, and are washed towards the processing plant.

4 Washing and scrubbing 
The next step of the actual production process is washing and scrubbing. This is done by moving the beet around in washing and scrubbing tanks not unlike a washing machine. However, the actual washing is caused by the friction of the sugar beets against each other. This removes sand and stones, but also a myriad of other objects.

5 Slicing 

The cleaned beets are then mechanically sliced into shoe string like thin strips called cossettes.

6 Diffusing 
The cossettes are then passed to a machine called a diffuser. Here hot water permeates them to extract the sugar content into a water solution, a process known as leaching. The diffusion process ends with two products: raw juice and beet pulp.

In detail a diffuser works as follows. Diffusers are long vessels of many metres in which the beet slices go in one direction while hot water goes in the opposite direction. The movement may either be caused by a rotating screw or the whole rotating unit, and the water and cossettes move through internal chambers. The three common designs of diffuser are the horizontal rotating "RT" (Raffinerie Tirlemontoise, manufacturer), inclined screw "DDS" (De Danske Sukkerfabrikker), or vertical screw "Tower". A less-common design uses a moving belt of cossettes, with water pumped onto the top of the belt and poured through. In all cases, the flow rates of cossettes and water are in the ratio one to two. Typically, cossettes take about 90 minutes to pass through the diffuser, the water only 45 minutes. These countercurrent exchange methods extract more sugar from the cossettes using less water than if they merely sat in a hot water tank. The liquid exiting the diffuser is called "raw juice". The colour of raw juice varies from black to a dark red depending on the amount of oxidation, which is itself dependent on diffuser design.

The used cossettes, or pulp, exit the diffuser at about 95% moisture, but low sucrose content. Using screw presses, the wet pulp is then pressed down to 75% moisture. This recovers additional sucrose in the liquid pressed out of the pulp, and reduces the energy needed to dry the pulp. The pressed pulp is dried and sold as animal feed, while the liquid pressed out of the pulp is combined with the raw juice, or more often introduced into the diffuser at the appropriate point in the countercurrent process. The final byproduct, vinasse, is used as fertilizer or growth substrate for yeast cultures.

During diffusion, a portion of the sucrose breaks down into invert sugars. These can undergo further breakdown into acids. These breakdown products are not only losses of sucrose, but also have knock-on effects reducing the final output of processed sugar from the factory. To limit (thermophilic) bacterial action, the feed water may be dosed with formaldehyde and control of the feed water pH is also practised. Attempts at operating diffusion under alkaline conditions have been made, but the process has proven problematic. The improved sucrose extraction in the diffuser is offset by processing problems in the next stages.

All this results in two products: beet pulp and raw juice. As mentioned before, the beet pulp, or cossettes is moved to other parts of the factory to create livestock feed. The raw juice moves to the next processing step, which might be  in the factory, but can also take place in a sugar refinery.

Raw sugar processing 

The next steps to produce white sugar are not specific for producing sugar from sugar beet. They also apply to producing white sugar from sugar cane. As such, they belong to the sugar refining process, not to the beet sugar production process.

a Purification / Carbonatation / Sulphonation 
The raw juice, also called raw sugar, first undergoes purification, carbonatation and sulphonation. First, hot milk of lime is added to precipitate impurities. In the carbonation step, carbon dioxide precipitates the lime and impurities are removed. The resulting thin juice may then undergo the sulphonation step, in which sulfur dioxide is used to bleach this juice.

b Evaporation 
The thin juice is concentrated by evaporation to make a "thick juice", roughly 60% sucrose by weight.

c Crystallization 
The crystallization process starts by depressurizing sugar liquor in vacuum pans which reduces boiling temperature and reduces formation of color compounds. Seed crystals are added to help with formation of crystals. Then it goes through a centrifuge to separate crystals from the remaining sugar liquor. The remaining liquor is then again boiled and centrifuged, producing brown sugar and molasses.

d Molasses recovery 
Since the molasses still contained sugar, it was advantageous to recover it. The Steffen Process was used to recover some, so advanced factories had a "Steffen house" next to the plant. Molasses can also serve to produce monosodium glutamate (MSG).

Byproducts

Carbonation-lime residue 
During the refining process, raw beet sugar requires much more lime for purification. Carbonation-lime residue contains about 80% Calcium carbonate and is therefore used to improve agricultural land.

Molasses 
The beet-sugar molasses that remain from the Crystallization phase are the most valuable byproduct. It can be sold on the yeast fermentation, pharmaceutical, and animal food markets. 

When the factory has a Molasses Desugaring by chromatography (MDC) process, processing leads to two more by products:
 CMS (concentrated molasses solids), which contains mainly minerals and is usually sold to the animal feed industry.
 Betaine chiefly through chromatographic separation, using techniques such as the "simulated moving bed".

History of the beet sugar industry

The first sugar factories are established 
Under the patronage of Frederick William III of Prussia, Franz Karl Achard opened the world's first beet sugar factory in 1801, at Kunern, Silesia (now Konary, Poland). The idea to produce sugar from beet was soon introduced to France, where Napoleon opened schools specifically for studying the plant. He also ordered that  be devoted to growing sugar beet. This was in response to British blockades of cane sugar during the Napoleonic Wars, which ultimately stimulated the rapid growth of a European sugar beet industry.
 By 1840, about 5% of the world's sugar was derived from sugar beets, and by 1880, this number had risen more than tenfold to over 50%. The sugar beet was introduced to North America after 1830, with the first commercial production starting in 1879 at a farm in Alvarado, California. The sugar beet was also introduced to Chile by German settlers around 1850.

France

The work of Achard soon attracted the attention of Napoleon Bonaparte, who appointed a commission of scientists to go to Silesia to investigate Achard's factory. Upon their return, two small factories were constructed near Paris. Although these factories were not altogether a success, the results attained greatly interested Napoleon. Thus, when two events, the blockade of Europe by the British Royal Navy and the Haitian Revolution, made the importation of cane sugar untenable, Napoleon seized the opportunity offered by beet sugar to address the shortage. In 1811, Napoleon issued a decree appropriating one million francs for the establishment of sugar schools, and compelling the farmers to plant a large acreage to sugar beets the following year. He also prohibited the further importation of sugar from the Caribbean effective in 1813.

The number of mills increased considerably during the 1820s and 1830s, reaching a peak of 543 in 1837. The number was down to 382 in 1842, producing about 22.5 million kg of sugar during that year.

Western Europe
As a result of the French advances in sugar beet production and processing made during the Napoleonic Wars, the beet sugar industry in Europe developed rapidly. A new tax levied in Germany in 1810 prompted the experimentation to increase the sugar content of the beet. This was because the tax assessed the value of the sugar beet crop based on the unprocessed weight of the sugar beet rather than the refined sugar produced from them. By 1812, Frenchman Jean-Baptiste Quéruel, working for the industrialist Benjamin Delessert, devised a process of sugar extraction suitable for industrial application. By 1837, France had become the largest sugar beet producer in the world, a position it continued to hold in the world even into 2010. By 1837, 542 factories in France were producing 35,000 tonnes of sugar. However, by 1880, Germany became the largest producer of sugar from sugar beet in the world, since the German factories processed most of the sugar beets grown in eastern France.

By the 1850s, sugar beet production had reached Russia and Ukraine. This was made possible by the protection of the sugar beet industry by bounties, or subsidies, paid to beet sugar producers upon the export of their sugar by their respective governments. The protection provided to the sugar beet industry by these bounties caused drastic damage to the cane sugar industry and their grip on the British sugar market. The result was a reduction in the production of cane sugar, molasses and rum until 1915. During World War I, the widespread conflict destroyed large tracts of land that had served sugar beet producers and repurposed much of the remaining sugar beet land for grain production. This resulted in a shortage that revived the shrinking cane sugar industry.

The sugar industry in the EU came under bureaucratic pressure in 2006 and ultimately resulted in the loss of 20,000 jobs, although many factories, as detailed in a later 2010 EU audit, were found to have been mistakenly shut down, as they were profitable without government intervention. In 2021/2022 the European Union was a small net importer of sugar.

United States

In the 1820s, the abolitionists in New England wanted to abolish slavery by boycotting the products that were made by slaves. They started to import sugar from Asia (called "free sugar" because it was grown without slavery), but this sugar tasted "awful". In order to overcome the problems of the "free sugar" from Asia, the "Beet Sugar Society of Philadelphia" was founded in 1836. It promoted cottage-produced beet sugar as an alternative to the slave-produced cane sugar from the West Indies. All pre-1870 movement failed, primarily because it approached the subject with naïve optimism and without sufficient capital. An attempt in Utah by the LDS Church-owned Deseret Manufacturing Company in the 1850s was carefully planned and funded, but failed due to saline soil conditions.

After many failures, E. H. Dyer acquired a defunct sugar factory in Alvarado, California (now Union City) in 1879, and succeeded in making sugar in commercially viable amounts. It was soon joined by the Western Beet Sugar Company in Watsonville The Oxnard brothers brought sugar beet cultivation to the plains, when they opened a factory in Grand Island, Nebraska. In Utah, Arthur Stayner and others were able to convince LDS Church leaders to support a second attempt. It led to the Utah-Idaho Sugar Company, which had Dyer built its factory in Lehi, Utah in 1890.

Capital investment in factories demanded an adequate supply of sugar beets. In central Colorado and western Nebraska, this was provided substantially by Germans from Russia who were already expert at sugar beet farming when they immigrated in large numbers circa 1890–1905. The United States now also began to catch up with Europe in research. The work of Rachel Lloyd at the University of Nebraska in the late 1880s resulted in a large production increase in the state of Nebraska.

By 1914, the sugar beet industry in the US matched the production of its European counterparts. The largest producers of beet sugar in the US were California, Utah, and Nebraska until the outbreak of World War II. In California, Japanese Americans were an important constituent in farming and production. When they were interned during World War II, California's beet sugar production stalled, and was largely shifted to inland states such as Idaho, Montana, North Dakota, and Utah. In many of the regions where new sugar beet farms were started during the war, farmers were unfamiliar with beet sugar cultivation, so they hired Japanese-American workers from internment camps who were familiar with sugar beet production to work on the farms.

Sugar beets are grown in 11 states and represent 50-55% of the US domestic sugar production. Sugarcane accounts for about 45% of US domestic sugar production. In 1995 sugarcane was grown commercially in Florida, Hawaii, Louisiana, Texas, and Puerto Rico. In 2016 the last sugar plantation and mill of Hawaii closed down.

United Kingdom

Sugar beets were not grown on a large scale in the United Kingdom until the mid-1920s, when 17 processing factories were built, following war-time shortages of imported cane sugar. Before World War I, with its far-flung empire, the United Kingdom simply imported the sugar from the cheapest market. However, World War I had created a shortage in sugar, prompting the development of domestic production. The first sugar beet processing factory was built at Lavenham in Suffolk in 1860, but failed after a few years without the government support its counterparts on the continent received. By the end of the century sugar production had ceased and the factory was re-purposed as a store house for horse hair and matting. It was totally destroyed by fire in 1905 and today, no trace remains. The Dutch built the first successful factory at Cantley in Norfolk in 1912, and it was moderately successful since, because of its Dutch backing, it received Dutch bounties.

Sugar beet seed from France was listed in the annual catalogues of Gartons Agricultural Plant Breeders from that firm's inception in 1898 until the first of their own varieties was introduced in 1909. In 1915, the British Sugar Beet Society was formed to create an example of a domestic sugar beet industry for the purpose of obtaining government financing which was delivered by the British Sugar (Subsidy) Act 1925. The sugar beet industry in the United Kingdom was finally subsidized providing stability to the domestic industry that had experienced volatile shifts in profits and losses in the years since 1915. The British Power Alcohol Association was founded in 1924 to promote the use of beet for fuel. In 2009 British Sugar owned the remaining four sugar factories in the United Kingdom.

Russia
References to the sugar manufacturing from beets in Russia date back to 1802. Jacob Esipov built the first Russian commercial factory producing sugar from beets in the Tula province. During the Soviet period, some particularly impressive advancements were made in seed development, of which the most useful was the development of frost-resistant sugar beet, further expanding the growing range of the sugar beet.

Australia and New Zealand 
There were various attempts, after 1865, to farm sugar beets in the Australian colony, later state, of Victoria. An industry was established in the district around Maffra in 1896. It became unprofitable due to a drought in 1899 and the factory was taken over by the Victorian government. It was reopened in 1910 and the industry flourished during the inter-war years. Production peaked in 1939–1940. The Second World War affected the industry by taking away its labour force. After the war ended, local farmers preferred dairying to labour-intensive and less-profitable sugar beet production, and the factory closed in 1948. It was the only significant sugar beet factory in Australia. Australia continues to be a major sugar producer, but all production is from sugar cane grown in Queensland and northern New South Wales.

Sugar beet is widely grown in New Zealand as cattle feed, and this practice has spread to some parts of Australia.

References

Citations

Bibliography
 
 
 
 
 
 
 
 
 
 
 
 
 
 
 
 
 
 
 
 
 
 
 
 
 
 
 
 
 
 
 
 
 
 
 
 
 
 
 
  
 
 
 
 

Food and drink articles needing attention